Leimbach is a commune in the Haut-Rhin department in Grand Est in north-eastern France.

Etymology
Leimbach was historically been attested as Leymbach in 1223. The toponym Leimbach is of Germanic origin, cognate to modern German Lehm, denoting clay. The Germanic hydronym *-bak(i) entered the French language via High German, and took on two forms: the Germanic form -bach and Romantic -bais.

See also
 Communes of the Haut-Rhin département

References

Communes of Haut-Rhin